The 1977–78 Cincinnati Bearcats men's basketball team represented the University of Cincinnati during the 1977–78 NCAA Division I men's basketball season. The Bearcats were led by head coach Gale Catlett, as members of the Metro Conference.

Schedule

|-
!colspan=12 style=|Metro Tournament

Players selected in NBA drafts

References 

Cincinnati Bearcats men's basketball seasons
Cincinnati Bearcats men's basketball
Cincinnati
Cincinnati Bearcats men's basketball